Gerald Oakley (born 25 July 1933) is a British former tennis player.

Born in Purley, Surrey, Oakley was a tall bespectacled player, active on tour from the 1940s to 1960s.

Oakley, a mixed doubles finalist at the 1949 French Championships, represented the Great Britain Davis Cup team in 1953 and 1953. He won both of his singles rubbers, including a five-set match against Wimbledon champion Bob Falkenburg of Brazil.

Grand Slam finals

Mixed doubles (1 runner-up)

See also
List of Great Britain Davis Cup team representatives

References

External links
 
 

1933 births
Living people
British male tennis players
English male tennis players
Tennis people from Surrey
People from Purley, London